Kozłowo  is a village in Nidzica County, Warmian-Masurian Voivodeship, in northern Poland. It is the seat of the gmina (administrative district) called Gmina Kozłowo. 

The village has a population of 3,000.

References

Villages in Nidzica County